N-Methyl-2-pyrrolidone (NMP) is an organic compound consisting of a 5-membered lactam.  It is a colorless liquid, although impure samples can appear yellow. It is miscible with water and with most common organic solvents. It also belongs to the class of dipolar aprotic solvents such as dimethylformamide and dimethyl sulfoxide. It is used in the petrochemical, polymer and battery industries as a solvent, exploiting its nonvolatility and ability to dissolve diverse materials (including polyvinylidene difluoride, PVDF).

Preparation
NMP is produced industrially by a typical ester-to-amide conversion, by treating butyrolactone with methylamine.  Alternative routes include the partial hydrogenation of N-methylsuccinimide and the reaction of acrylonitrile with methylamine followed by hydrolysis.  About 200,000 to 250,000 tons are produced annually.

Applications

NMP is used to recover certain hydrocarbons generated in the processing of petrochemicals, such as the recovery of 1,3-butadiene and acetylene.  It is used to absorb hydrogen sulfide from  sour gas and hydrodesulfurization facilities. Its good solvency properties have led to NMP's use to dissolve a wide range of polymers. Specifically, it is used as a solvent for surface treatment of textiles, resins, and metal coated plastics or as a paint stripper. It is also used as a solvent in the commercial preparation of polyphenylene sulfide. In the pharmaceutical industry, N-methyl-2-pyrrolidone is used in the formulation for drugs by both oral and transdermal delivery routes. It is also used heavily in lithium ion battery fabrication, as a solvent for electrode preparation, because NMP has a unique ability to dissolve polyvinylidene fluoride binder. Due to NMP's toxicity and high boiling point, there  is much effort to replace it in battery manufacturing with other solvent(s), like water.

Health hazards

N-Methyl-2-pyrrolidone is an agent that causes the production of physical defects in the developing embryo. It also is a reproductive toxin, a chemical that is toxic to the reproductive system, including defects in the progeny and injury to male or female reproductive function. Reproductive toxicity includes developmental effects. The substance can be absorbed into the body by inhalation, through the skin and by ingestion. When people are exposed to it, rapid, irregular respiration, shortness of breath, decreased pain reflex, and slight bloody nasal secretion are possible. Inhalation can result in headaches and exposure on skin can result in redness and pain. When ingested it will cause a burning sensation in the throat and chest. It also can cause an acute solvent syndrome.

Biological aspects

In rats, NMP is absorbed rapidly after inhalation, oral, and dermal administration, distributed throughout the organism, and eliminated mainly by hydroxylation to polar compounds, which are excreted via urine. About 80% of the administered dose is excreted as NMP and NMP metabolites within 24 hours. A probably dose dependent yellow coloration of the urine in rodents is observed. The major metabolite is 5-hydroxy-N-methyl-2-pyrrolidone. 

Studies in humans show comparable results. Dermal penetration through human skin has been shown to be very rapid. NMP is rapidly biotransformed by hydroxylation to 5-hydroxy-N-methyl-2-pyrrolidone, which is further oxidized to N-methylsuccinimide; this intermediate is further hydroxylated to 2-hydroxy-N-methylsuccinimide. These metabolites are all colourless. The excreted amounts of NMP metabolites in the urine after inhalation or oral intake represented about 100% and 65% of the administered doses, respectively. NMP has a low potential for skin irritation and a moderate potential for eye irritation in rabbits. Repeated daily doses of 450 mg/kg body weight administered to the skin caused painful and severe haemorrhage and eschar formation in rabbits. These adverse effects have not been seen in workers occupationally exposed to pure NMP, but they have been observed after dermal exposure to NMP used in cleaning processes. No sensitization potential has been observed.

See also
 2-Pyrrolidone
 1,3-Dimethyl-2-imidazolidinone (DMI)

References

Amide solvents
Pyrrolidones
Excipients